Robert Stephen Jarvis is a British actor who has appeared in films including Harry Potter and the Order of the Phoenix, and in television programmes including Genie in the House, The History Boys and Waking the Dead.

Early life
Jarvis was born in Yeovil, Somerset. He attended the Littlehampton Community School and Chichester College, He joined the National Youth Theatre aged 16 and performed with the company until he was 18.

Career
Jarvis played young James Potter in the film adaptation of Harry Potter and the Order of the Phoenix (2007). In 2006, he made a brief appearance in the Nickelodeon show Genie in the House and did voice work for the acclaimed film The History Boys. He has also guest starred in episodes of Waking the Dead for the BBC and ITV's Trial & Retribution. He returned to the stage in 2012 at the Southwark Playhouse in the latest play by Philip Ridley, Shivered.

Personal Life
Jarvis met Evanna Lynch while filming Harry Potter and the Order of the Phoenix in 2006. The couple dated for nine years and remain close friends.

Filmography
 Genie in the House (2006), Billy – "Out of Our Minds"
 Harry Potter and the Order of the Phoenix (2007), Teenage James Potter
 Waking The Dead – "Double Bind" (2007), Young Chris Lennon
 Trial & Retribution XVII: Conviction (2008), Mark
 The Space You Leave aka Sea Change (2008), Rupert
 Coming Back (2009), Steve
 The Real Midnight Express (2010), Billy Hayes
 Upstairs Downstairs (2012), John F. Kennedy
 All Is by My Side (2013), Andrew Loog Oldham

References

External links

Living people
1986 births
21st-century English male actors
English male film actors
English male television actors
Male actors from Somerset
National Youth Theatre members
People from Yeovil